Damaru Ko Dandibiyo is 2018 Nepalese drama sport film directed by Chhetan Gurung, and written by Khagendra Lamichhane. The film is produced by Binod Gurung, and Norbu Tshering  Ghale under the banner of Sambridhi Entertainment. The film stars Khagendra Lamichhane, Anup Baral, Menuka Pradhan, Budhhi Tamang, Ankeet Khadka, Aashant Sharma and Laxmi Bardewa in the lead roles.

Plot 
Damaru (Khagendra Lamichhane) comes to his village to revive the old forgotten sport Dandi Biyo. His father Yogendra (Anup Baral), a former Dandi Biyo player opposes the idea of reviving the game.

Cast 

 Khagendra Lamichhane as Damaru
 Menuka Pradhan as Mala
 Buddhi Tamang as Mukihya
 Anup Baral as Yogendra
 Laxmi Bardewa as Nirmala
 Ashant Sharma as Kasiram

Soundtrack

References

External links 

 

2018 films
2010s sports drama films
Nepalese drama films
2018 drama films